Termatosaurus ("end lizard", because it came from the end of the Upper Triassic) is a genus of archosaur known from several tooth specimens differentiated between two species. Its remains come from the Upper Triassic and was once thought to have survived until the Early Jurassic, but the Jurassic remains were redescribed as plesiosaur remains. It has only been found in France, England, Germany and Switzerland. and two species are known of this animal: the type species, Termatosaurus albertii, named by Meyer and T. Plieninger in 1844; and T. crocodilinus, by Quenstedt (1858).  It is very obscure and apparently considered to be dubious. 

According to Oskar Kuhn, Termatosaurus is a plesiosaur (of the Rhomaleosauridae), while according to other sources, it is a phytosaur. Currently, Termatosaurus is seen as a dubious archosaur.

Gallery

References

Nomina dubia
Phytosaurs
Late Triassic reptiles of Europe
Fossil taxa described in 1844
Taxa named by Christian Erich Hermann von Meyer
Prehistoric reptile genera